Area  51 is a video game series inspired by Area 51 military facility. The franchise was launched by Atari Games as a series of two arcade light gun shooters and was revisited by Midway Games as a series of first-person shooters. The original arcade games cast the player as a member of a special military unit that must battle an invasion of aliens called the Kronn. Versions of the original Area 51 were released for various home consoles. The Midway titles, exclusive to home systems, had different plots from the original games.

Games
The original Area 51 was released into arcades in 1995, and ported in 1996 to the PlayStation, Sega Saturn and PC. A sequel, Area 51: Site 4 was released by Atari in 1998. Unlike the original, it was not ported to any home consoles. Like all of Atari Games' products, it was absorbed into Midway Games' portfolio after Midway's shutdown of Atari Games in 2003.

Midway subsequently rebooted the franchise as a first-person shooter. In 2005, Area 51 was released by Midway for the PlayStation 2, Xbox and Microsoft Windows platforms. A sequel, BlackSite: Area 51 was released in 2007 for the PlayStation 3, Xbox 360 and Windows.

Film 
On August 31, 2004, Paramount Pictures announced that it had bought the world-wide film rights for the series. Billed as an action-packed thriller, producer Christine Peters was said to be collaborating with the game developers to help construct the film. On September 9, Variety reported that Paramount had hired Dean Georgaris to write the screenplay and produce with partner Micheal Aguilar. It was to be under their Penn Station banner along with Christine Peters and Midway; As of 2011, the status of the film's development was unknown.

References

Atari games
Midway video games
Warner Bros. Games franchises
Video game franchises introduced in 1995